Slobozia Mândra is a commune in Teleorman County, Muntenia, Romania. It is composed of a single village, Slobozia Mândra. It also included two other villages until 2004, when they were split off to form Uda-Clocociov Commune.

The commune is situated in the Wallachian Plain, a short distance from the Olt River.

References

Communes in Teleorman County
Localities in Muntenia